Li Daishen (28 September 1891 – 15 November 1959) was a Chinese educator and military officer.

Names
His courtesy name was Boqin,  and his art name was Caichi.

Biography
Li was born in Daqiao Town of Hengshan County, Hunan, on September 28, 1891. His father, Li Yinqiu, was a local official. In 1906, he went to study at Hongwen Academy with his father, in Japan. In 1908, he returned to China after graduation.

During the Wuchang Uprising, he was an ordnance officer at the Tongmenghui army.  In the autumn of 1912, he went to study in Japan again, where he was educated at the University of Tokyo, he earned his Bachelor of Engineering in 1919, by age 29. He became the chief engineer of Guangdong Arsenal in 1920. One year later, he was appointed chief engineer of Hunan Iron Factory. He received his Doctor of Metallurgy from Harvard University in 1923. He was President of Hunan University in February 1926, and held that office until July 1926. In 1927, he served as Director of the Political Department of the 40th Army of the National Revolutionary Army. At the same year, he was an engineer of Shanghai Arsenal. In 1928, he was promoted to the rank of Major General. And he was awarded Order of the Cloud and Banner in 1935, at the age of 45. In 1937, during the Second Sino-Japanese War, he was made a Lieutenant General. On August 28, 1945, he attended the Chongqing negotiation and visited the Communist leader Mao Zedong. In 1946, he was appointed the Deputy Head of the Chinese Mission to Japan, and one year later, the Chinese Representative to Japan. After the founding of the Communist state, he moved to Japan.

Li died of heart disease in Kaohsiung, Taiwan, on November 15, 1959.

Work
 Modern Weapons
 After the Revolution in Russia
 Metallic Materials
 Manufacture of Weapons
 National Defense and Industry
 Calculation of Weapons
 The Structure and Theory of Weapons
 Yingminglu
 Basis of the Construction of National Defense
 The Present Situation of Hainan Island
 Atomic Weapons

Personal life
Li married Gan Kui.

References

1891 births
People from Hengshan County
1959 deaths
University of Tokyo alumni
Harvard University alumni
Presidents of Hunan University
Republic of China Army generals